is a Japanese footballer currently playing as a forward for Tokushima Vortis.

Career statistics

Club
.

Notes

References

External links

2002 births
Living people
People from Tokushima (city)
Association football people from Tokushima Prefecture
Japanese footballers
Association football forwards
J1 League players
Tokushima Vortis players